Paul Norman Seymour (January 30, 1928 – May 5, 1998) was an American professional basketball player and coach.

Playing career
A 6'1" guard, Seymour played collegiately at the University of Toledo, and had a 12-year career in the NBA and its predecessor, the Basketball Association of America (BAA).  He played his first season for the Baltimore Bullets of the BAA; the remainder of his career was with the Syracuse Nationals.

Seymour was named to the All-NBA second team in the 1954–55 and 1954–55 seasons and played in three NBA All-Star Games during his career.  He won a championship with the Nationals in the 1954–55 season.  For a good part of his career, Seymour was a player-coach for the Nats.

Seymour still shares, with former teammate Red Rocha, the NBA record for most minutes in a playoff game with 67.

Coaching career
After finishing his playing career, Seymour continued a successful coaching career in the NBA, coaching three more teams. Altogether he coached four teams in eight seasons. In 1961, he was the head coach of the Western Division Team in the All Star Game.

Seymour was mentioned in the ESPN documentary, Black Magic, which told the story of African-Americans and basketball. In a segment about Cleo Hill, it was revealed that during the 1961–62 season, Bob Pettit and Cliff Hagan approached management and complained that Hill was taking too many shots. (Allegedly, this was just a cover-up for their desire to not play with an African-American teammate.) Management granted their wish, telling Seymour to severely diminish Hill's offensive role. Seymour's refusal resulted in his dismissal 14 games into the season on November 17, 1961. His replacement on an interim basis was Pettit. Seymour had no ill feelings towards team owner Ben Kerner, stating, "He didn't fire me. The players did."

While coaching at Baltimore during the 1965–1966 season, Seymour deliberately ended Johnny Kerr's then-record consecutive-games-played streak of 844 games by benching the team captain for one game. According to Kerr, only after the game did Seymour tell Kerr about his intention to end Kerr's streak, saying, "This will take the pressure off you."

Later years
Seymour was featured in the book, Basketball History in Syracuse, Hoops Roots by author Mark Allen Baker published by The History Press in 2010. The book is an introduction to professional basketball in Syracuse and includes teams like (Vic Hanson's) All-Americans, the Syracuse Reds and the Syracuse Nationals  (1946–1963).

Seymour was elected to the first class of the Greater Syracuse Sports Hall of Fame in 1987 along with owner Dan Biasone and NBA all-time great Dolph Schayes.

BAA/NBA career statistics

Regular season

Playoffs

References

External links
 BasketballReference.com: Paul Seymour (as player)
 BasketballReference.com: Paul Seymour (as coach)
 Paul Seymour grave at Woodlawn Cemetery (Syracuse, New York)

1928 births
1998 deaths
American men's basketball coaches
American men's basketball players
Baltimore Bullets (1963–1973) head coaches
Baltimore Bullets (1944–1954) players
Basketball coaches from Ohio
Basketball players from Ohio
Detroit Pistons head coaches
National Basketball Association All-Stars
People from Jensen Beach, Florida
Player-coaches
Professional Basketball League of America players
Sportspeople from Toledo, Ohio
St. Louis Hawks head coaches
Syracuse Nationals head coaches
Syracuse Nationals players
Toledo Jeeps players
Toledo Rockets men's basketball players
Guards (basketball)
Eastern Basketball Association coaches